The 1938 All-Ireland Senior Football Championship was the 52nd staging of Ireland's premier Gaelic football knock-out competition. Galway won their third title ending Kerry's year.

Format

The All-Ireland Senior Football Championship was run on a provincial basis as usual, with a rotation system of every 3rd season from this year onwards meaning for with the four winners from Connacht, Leinster, Munster and Ulster advancing to the All-Ireland semi-finals.  The draw for these games was as follows:
 Connacht V. Ulster
 Munster V. Leinster

Results

Connacht Senior Football Championship

Leinster Senior Football Championship

Munster Senior Football Championship

Ulster Senior Football Championship

All-Ireland Senior Football Championship

Championship statistics

Miscellaneous

 The Preliminary Round of the Leinster football championship saw 2 draws and replays, They were the matches between Carlow vs Wicklow and Offaly vs Wexford.
 Laois become the last team until Offaly (1971-1973) to complete a triple of Leinster titles.
 The All Ireland semi finals become Rotation of every 3 years from this years on words between the champions of each province.
 The All-Ireland final for the only time in history ends in a draw and goes to a replay for the 2nd year in a row.

References

All-Ireland Senior Football Championship